Ryan Hughes may refer to:

 Ryan Hughes (footballer), English footballer
 Ryan Hughes (poker player) (born 1981), American poker player
 Ryan Hughes (ice hockey) (born 1972), Canadian ice hockey player
 Ryan Hughes (motocross) (born 1973), American motocross champion

See also
 Hughes–Ryan Act, a 1974 United States federal law that amended the Foreign Assistance Act of 1961

fr:Ryan Hughes